Two different races were named AdvoCare 500 in 2012:
The 2012 AdvoCare 500 (Atlanta), a NASCAR Sprint Cup Series race held at Atlanta Motor Speedway held on September 2(now Folds of Honor Quiktrip 500) 
The 2012 AdvoCare 500 (Phoenix), a NASCAR Sprint Cup Series race held at Phoenix International Raceway held on November 11 (now Bluegreen Vacations 500)